Riverdale Village is an outdoor shopping center in Coon Rapids, Minnesota, United States. It opened in 1999 and has over 75 stores. It is located just off of U.S. Route 10. Stores such as JCPenney, Kohl's, Lowe's, and The Home Depot anchor here. Riverdale Village also has many dining choices. Riverdale Village is still open today and has renovated and added onto it many times. On June 4, 2017, it was announced that Sears would be closing as part of the plan to close 150 stores nationwide. The store closed in March 2017. On June 4, 2020, it was announced that JCPenney would also be closing as part of a plan to close 154 stores nationwide. The store closed in October 2020.

References

External links
 DDR Corp - Riverdale Village

Shopping malls in Minnesota
Shopping malls established in 2002